New Market may refer to:

Bangladesh 
New Market, Dhaka
New Market, Khulna, in Sonadanga Model Thana
New Market, Chittagong, near Government City College, Chittagong

India 
New Market, Bhopal
New Market, Kolkata

Jamaica
New Market, Jamaica

United States 
New Market, Alabama
New Market, Delaware
New Market, Indiana
New Market, Clark County, Indiana
New Market, Iowa
New Market, Kentucky
New Market, Maryland
New Market, Minnesota
New Market, Missouri
New Market, Middlesex County, New Jersey
New Market, Ohio
New Market (Philadelphia, Pennsylvania), listed on the NRHP
New Market, Pennsylvania
New Market (Greeleyville, South Carolina), listed on the NRHP
New Market, Tennessee
New Market, Virginia
New Market, Washington, a settlement now called Tumwater, Washington
New Market Historic District (disambiguation), a list of places on the National Register of Historic Places (NRHP)
New Market Presbyterian Church (disambiguation)
New Market Township (disambiguation)

See also 
Neumarkt (disambiguation), places in German-speaking areas
Newmarket (disambiguation)
Nieuwmarkt, square in Amsterdam, Netherlands
Novi Pazar (disambiguation), places in South Slavic countries